The Leibstadt Nuclear Power Plant (KKL) is located near Leibstadt, canton of Aargau, Switzerland, on the Rhine River and close to the border to Germany. Commissioned in 1984, it is the youngest and most powerful of the country's four operating reactors.

Its General Electric built boiling water reactor produces 1,220 MW of electrical power. The nuclear power station has produced approximately 8.5 TWh per year, slightly less than the power station Gösgen.

It is owned by Leibstadt AG (KKL), a consortium of six Swiss energy companies: the Aare Tessin AG for electricity (Atel) with 27%, the northeast power stations AG (NOK) with 23%, the central-Swiss power stations AG (CKW) with 14%, the electricity company Laufenburg AG (EGL) with 16%, the Bern power stations AG (BKW FMB energy AG) with 10% and the Aargauer of power stations AG (AEW energy AG) with 5%. The management was originally done by the EGL, but with establishment of the Axpo it was consolidated within the Axpo group, so whereby today the NOK is the manager. The plant also houses a 380 kV switchyard for Beznau.

Planning for the KKL began in 1964 for a 600 MW reactor. The Swiss Federal Council opposed direct cooling by river water, replaced in the design in 1971 with a cooling tower. During further planning the output was increased to 900 and then 1200 MW. In the wake of the 1979 Three Mile Island accident new safety regulations were implemented, delaying completion for several years. The 2 billion Swiss franc construction budget spiraled to over 5 billion before the plant opened in 1984 after eleven years of construction.

With the installation of a new low pressure turbine in 2010 Leibstadt achieved an increase of 40 megawatts. A new 420 Tonne generator, the heaviest AIL to be carried on Switzerland's roads, has significantly improved the power plants performance.

The history of the completion of the KKL reflected increasingly critical attitudes toward nuclear power in Switzerland during the 1970s and 1980s, which culminated in the resistance against the Kaiseraugst Nuclear Power Plant.

Nuclear events

Gallery

See also 
Nuclear power in Switzerland
Anti-nuclear movement in Switzerland

References

External links 

Nuclear power stations in Switzerland